Jack Keane is a 2007 point-and-click adventure game developed by Deck13 Interactive, published by 10tacle Studios, and digitally distributed by Legacy Interactive. Jack Keane is an adventure game in the spirit of Monkey Island, with references to well-known computer games and classic films. Players assume the role of a hapless, swashbuckling adventurer and accompany him in his travels across 15 locations throughout London, Cape Town, and Tooth Island. The game contains various humorous references, e.g. regarding Indiana Jones, the Monkey Island adventure game series, the computer game Ankh, Star Wars, the TV series Lost and the Lord of the Rings films.

Gameplay

Plot
In colonial England, under a certain amount of duress, Jack takes on a job which will not only cause him a great deal of trouble, but also bring to light the answer to a mystery out of his distant past. A lack of money leads Jack to accept a charter to take a British secret agent to mysterious Tooth Island. When Jack's ship shatters on the mysterious island's cliffs on arrival and the secret agent quickly becomes a meal for a monster in the jungle, Jack is soon left to cope with the situation on his own. Players interact with dozens of characters and use more than 250 found objects to solve puzzles, as Jack moves closer to solving the mystery of his past and how it ties in with the present.

Development

Reception

Domestic

International

Sequel
A sequel to the game, Jack Keane 2: The Fire Within, was released in 2013.

See also
Daedalic Entertainment
Runaway 2: The Dream of the Turtle
Tony Tough 2: A Rake's Progress

References

External links

Deck13 Interactive official site

2007 video games
Adventure games
Deck13 games
Focus Entertainment games
Legacy Games games
Linux games
MacOS games
Point-and-click adventure games
RuneSoft games
Single-player video games
Strategy First games
Video games developed in Germany
Video games set in Africa
Video games set in India
Video games set in London
Windows games
10tacle Studios games